Leopold von Gerlach  is the short-form name of:
Carl Friedrich Leopold von Gerlach (1757–1813), first mayor of Berlin
Ludwig Friedrich Leopold von Gerlach (1790–1861), his son who became a Prussian general